Mathura Prasad Pal (3 January 1946 – 22 July 2017) was an Indian politician and a member of Uttar Pradesh Legislative Assembly. He represented the Sikandra assembly constituency of Kanpur Dehat district.

Political career
He was elected for the first time in 1991 from Sarvankhera assembly constituency of Kanpur Dehat district as the Janata Dal candidate and a second time in 1996 as the Bharatiya Janata Party candidate. In the 2017 Uttar Pradesh Assembly Election, Pal defeated his close contestant Mahendra Katiyar of the Bahujan Samaj Party with a margin of 38,103 votes and became a member of the Uttar Pradesh Legislative Assembly for the third time.

Pal died on 22 July 2017 of cancer.

Posts held

References 

1946 births
2017 deaths
Uttar Pradesh MLAs 2017–2022
Bharatiya Janata Party politicians from Uttar Pradesh
People from Kanpur Dehat district